Ekaterina Vladimirovna Galkina (born 10 August 1988 in Moscow) is a Russian curler.

At the 2006 Winter Olympics, in Turin, Italy, she was part of Ludmila Privivkova's team. A year later this team won the 2006 European Curling Championships.

She has studied Management and International Relations at the Russian State University for the Humanities.

In January 2010 Galkina was officially named to the Russian Olympic Team.
She and her teammates represented Russia at the 2014 Ford World Women's Curling Championship held in Saint John, New Brunswick, Canada, from 15 to 23 March. The team had an 8-3 record in the round robin and was seeded third in the playoffs. Team Russia lost the 3-4 Page playoff game to Team Korea, but later defeated Team Korea to win the bronze medal. It was the first medal for Russia in the world women's curling championships. The team also competed for Russia at the 2014 Winter Olympics held in Sochi, Russia, and finished in ninth place.

Galkina is a five-time Russian women's champion curler. She played on many international events as a member of national or club teams.

Currently she works as an Executive Board member for Russian Curling Federation and time to time served as a curling color commentator for Match TV (Russian federal sports television channel) and Russian Curling TV YouTube channel.

Teams

Women's

Mixed

References

External links

 Official website of Team Sidorova (web archive)
 ГАЛКИНА Екатерина Владимировна | Российские спортсмены и специалисты | Спортивная Россия (Galkina Ekaterina Vladimirovna - Sports Russia)

1988 births
Living people
Russian female curlers
Curlers from Moscow
Curlers at the 2006 Winter Olympics
Olympic curlers of Russia
Curlers at the 2010 Winter Olympics
Curlers at the 2014 Winter Olympics
Medalists at the 2007 Winter Universiade
Russian curling champions
European curling champions
Universiade medalists in curling
Universiade gold medalists for Russia
Universiade silver medalists for Russia
Universiade bronze medalists for Russia
Competitors at the 2007 Winter Universiade
Competitors at the 2009 Winter Universiade
Competitors at the 2011 Winter Universiade
Competitors at the 2013 Winter Universiade
Competitors at the 2015 Winter Universiade
21st-century Russian women